Kotlassia is an extinct genus of seymouriamorph. Fossils of it are found in Russia, in the village of Novinki, close to the city of Kotlas. The name of the genus is derived from the city. The layers in which the fossils were found date from the Late Permian. Along with many other animals Kotlassia died out at the end of the Permian in the Permian–Triassic extinction event that marked the border between the Permian and Triassic periods.

References

Seymouriamorphs
Permian tetrapods
Fossils of Russia